Madison County is a county located in the western part of the U.S. state of Tennessee. As of the 2020 census, the population was 98,823. Its county seat is Jackson. Madison County is included in the Jackson, TN Metropolitan Statistical Area.

History

Madison County was formed in 1821, and named for founding father and president, James Madison. The county was part of lands the United States purchased from the Chickasaw in 1818. After Congressional passage of the Indian Removal Act of 1830, most Chickasaw were forced out of the state and west to Indian Territory beyond the Mississippi River.

Pinson Mounds, one of the largest Woodland period (c. 1-500CE) mound complexes in the United States, is located in Madison County. It has the second-tallest earthwork mound in the United States.

Geography

Airport
McKellar-Sipes Regional Airport (MKL) serves the county. Lake Graham, a large 500 acre reservoir primarily intended for recreation and wildlife habitat, is located in the county 5 miles east of Jackson.

Adjacent counties
Gibson County (north)
Carroll County (northeast)
Henderson County (east)
Chester County (southeast)
Hardeman County (south)
Haywood County (west)
Crockett County (northwest)

State protected areas
Pinson Mounds State Archaeological Park
South Fork Waterfowl Refuge
Lake Graham

Demographics

2020 census

As of the 2020 United States census, there were 98,823 people, 38,930 households, and 25,748 families residing in the county.

2000 census
As of the census of 2000, there were 91,837 people, 35,552 households, and 24,637 families residing in the county.  The population density was 165 people per square mile (64/km2).  There were 38,205 housing units at an average density of 69 per square mile (26/km2).  There were 35,552 households, out of which 33.50% had children under the age of 18 living with them, 49.80% were married couples living together, 15.90% had a female householder with no husband present, and 30.70% were non-families. 26.20% of all households were made up of individuals, and 9.30% had someone living alone who was 65 years of age or older.  The average household size was 2.49 and the average family size was 3.00.

The racial makeup of the county was 65.20% non-Hispanic White or European American, 32.46% non-Hispanic Black or African American, 0.16% Native American, 0.63% Asian, 0.01% Pacific Islander, 0.67% from other races, and 0.86% from two or more races.  1.71% of the population were Hispanic or Latino of any race.

There were 35,552 households, out of which 33.50% had children under the age of 18 living with them, 49.80% were married couples living together, 15.90% had a female householder with no husband present, and 30.70% were non-families. 26.20% of all households were made up of individuals, and 9.30% had someone living alone who was 65 years of age or older.  The average household size was 2.49 and the average family size was 3.00.

In the county, the population was spread out, with 25.80% under the age of 18, 11.00% from 18 to 24, 29.10% from 25 to 44, 21.70% from 45 to 64, and 12.30% who were 65 years of age or older.  The median age was 35 years. For every 100 females, there were 92.10 males.  For every 100 females age 18 and over, there were 87.20 males.

The median income for a household in the county was $36,982, and the median income for a family was $44,595. Males had a median income of $34,253 versus $23,729 for females. The per capita income for the county was $19,389.  About 10.80% of families and 14.00% of the population were below the poverty line, including 18.40% of those under age 18 and 11.80% of those age 65 or over.

Government

The county is headed by an elected county mayor (currently A.J. Massey) and county commission of 25 members elected from 10 districts.

Healthcare
West Tennessee Healthcare (Jackson-Madison County General Hospital District), created by a law passed by the Tennessee General Assembly in 1949, serves as the public hospital system of the county. The county appoints some of the members of the board of directors.

Trivia
This is the Madison County to which Kenny Rogers refers in his song "Reuben James".

Communities

Cities
 Humboldt (mostly in Gibson County)
 Jackson (county seat)
 Medon
 Three Way

Unincorporated communities

 Adair
 Beech Bluff
 Claybrook
 Denmark
 Five Points
 Mercer
 Neely
 Oakfield
 Pinson
 Spring Creek

Education
Jackson-Madison County School System is the public school district.

West Tennessee School for the Deaf is a state-operated school in the county.

See also
National Register of Historic Places listings in Madison County, Tennessee

References

External links

Madison County official website
 Madison County, TNGenWeb – free genealogy resources for the county

 
1821 establishments in Tennessee
Populated places established in 1821
Jackson metropolitan area, Tennessee
Second Amendment sanctuaries in Tennessee
West Tennessee